Nugzar is a Georgian masculine given name. It may refer to
Nugzar Asatiani (1937–1992), Soviet fencer 
Nugzar Ashuba (born 1952), politician from Abkhazia 
Nugzar Bagration-Gruzinsky (born 1950), Georgian nobleman
Nugzar Kvirtia (born 1984), Georgian football player 
Nugzar Lobzhanidze (born 1971), Georgian football player
Nugzar Logua, painter, poet and politician from Abkhazia
Nugzar Tatalashvili (born 1990), Georgian judoka